GBSB Global Business School is a private business school located in Barcelona and Madrid, Spain and in Birkirkara, Malta.

Academic programs
GBSB Global Business School offers undergraduate and graduate business degrees (Bachelor of Business Administration and Digital Innovation (B.A.), Master of Business Administration (MBA)) and various master's degrees. All programs are taught in English. Some master's degrees are offered with a dual-degree option from the University of Vic - Central University of Catalonia (UVic-UCC) Students graduating with a Bachelor of Business Administration and Digital Innovation degree, additionally obtain Level 4 and Level 5 ATHE Extended Diploma in Management, officially recognized by OFQUAL in the UK, which allows students to complete a top-up year in the leading UK universities and earn a double bachelor's degree.

Accreditations
GBSB Global Business School is accredited by Accreditation Service for International Schools, Colleges and Universities (ASIC). ASIC is recognised by UKVI in UK, is a member of the CHEA International Quality Group (CIQG) in USA and is listed in their International Directory, is a member of the BQF (British Quality Foundation), are affiliates of ENQA (European Network for Quality Assurance) and are institutional members of EDEN (European Distance and E-Learning Network). Several Master programs at GBSB Global are accredited by ECBE (European Council for Business Education), the leading accreditation organization in Europe that helps to ensure that accredited members satisfy the requirements of the European Higher Education Area (EHEA) as set forth in the Bologna Process and other EU directives. GBSB Global is accredited by the Accreditation Council for Business Schools and Programs (ACBSP). ACBSP is a leading U.S. specialized accreditation body for business education supporting, celebrating, and rewarding excellence in teaching. The association embraces teaching excellence as one of its main virtues and emphasizes the importance of learning to students worldwide. ACBSP is recognized by the Council for Higher Education Accreditation (CHEA). GBSB Global is also a member at The Association to Advance Collegiate Schools of Business (AACSB).

Accredited by the Malta Further & Higher Education Authority (MFHEA).

Rankings
MBA program at GBSB Global is ranked as Tier One in the Global MBA Rankings and European MBA Rankings in CEO Magazine. The Online MBA is ranked as 6th in the Global Online MBA rankings in CEO Magazine.,

GBSB Global received 3 top scores in Group 1 & 2 in U-Multirank for divisions of Research, Teaching & Learning and International Orientation.

G-Accelerator
In 2018 GBSB Global Business School launched its first edition of the G-Accelerator, a new pre-incubator, incubator, and accelerator program that aims to help and support new and existing ventures introduced to the market by entrepreneurs. In 2020 the G-Accelerator was officially selected to be part of the #ProgramaPrimer - a governmental initiative that responds to one of the great challenges of the Government of the Generalitat and of Catalunya Emprèn: to promote an entrepreneurship of companies based on innovation and technology that expands the effect of the technological hub of Barcelona throughout Catalonia.  Programa Primer is promoted by the Department of Business and Knowledge within the framework of Catalunya Emprèn and co-financed by the European Social Fund.

References

Business schools in Spain